Harry Baird (12 May 193113 February 2005) was a Guyanese-born British actor who came to prominence in the 1960s, appearing in more than 36 films throughout his career. He is best remembered as the bus driver in the final scene of The Italian Job.

Life and career
Baird was born in Georgetown, British Guiana, and educated in Canada and Britain. He was 17 years old when he joined his brother in London and, driven by an early interest in the cinema, began training at the YMCA. He made his first film appearance in 1955 as a boxer called Jamaica in Carol Reed's A Kid for Two Farthings. A year later, he appeared in the play Kismet at the Stoll Theatre in London, and had a role in Jean Genet's The Blacks in 1961 at the Royal Court Theatre.

Baird subsequently appeared mostly in film and television, though other stage work included A Wreath for Udomo (Lyric Hammersmith, 1961) and Ogodiveleftthegason (Royal Court, 1967).

His first lead role was as Atimbu, in the TV series White Hunter, in 1958. A series of stereotyped roles followed, in low-budget films featuring generic African or "jungle" themes. Baird's most high-profile role, however, came in Michael Relph and Basil Dearden's racial drama film Sapphire (1959). Prominent roles for black actors in Britain remained scarce, although he appeared in supporting roles in the TV series Danger Man and UFO (1970; as Lieutenant Bradley, a role that he left halfway through the series' run).

Baird's only true lead film role was in the 1968 Melvin Van Peebles drama The Story of a Three-Day Pass, in which he played an American soldier who falls in love with a white Parisian woman. Other roles included The Whisperers (1967), The Touchables (1968) (as a gay wrestler named Lillywhite), the horror film The Oblong Box (1969), and The Italian Job (1969) alongside his friend Michael Caine, whose wife, fellow Guyanese actor Shakira Baksh, Baird had appeared alongside in UFO.

His last appearance on screen was in Four of the Apocalypse (I quattro dell'apocalisse) in 1975.

In the 1970s, Baird was diagnosed with glaucoma, a condition that ultimately left him blind. He died of cancer in London in 2005.

Selected filmography

A Kid for Two Farthings (1955) - Jamaica (uncredited)
Sapphire (1959) - Johnnie Fiddle
Killers of Kilimanjaro (1959) - Boraga
Tarzan the Magnificent (1960) - Warrior Leader
Offbeat (1961) - Gill Hall
The Mark (1961) - Cole
Flame in the Streets (1961) - Billy
The Road to Hong Kong (1962) - Nubian at Lamasary (uncredited)
Station Six-Sahara (1963) - Sailor 
The Small World of Sammy Lee (1963) - Buddy Shine
Taur the Mighty (1963) - Ubaratutu
Thor and the Amazon Women (1963) -Ubaratutu
Goliath and the Rebel Slave (1963) - Slave (uncredited)
Traitor's Gate (1964) - Mate on Tramp Steamer
He Who Rides a Tiger (1965) - Stan (uncredited)
The Whisperers (1967) - The Man Upstairs
The Story of a Three-Day Pass (1968) - Turner
The Touchables (1968) - Lillywhite
The Italian Job (1969) - Big William
The Oblong Box (1969) - N'Galo
Castle Keep (1969) - Dancing Soldier (uncredited)
Cool It Carol! (1970) - Benny Gray
Fun and Games (1971) - Carl
Trinity and Sartana Are Coming (1972) - Trinità
Those Dirty Dogs (1973) - Corp. Washington Smith
The Count of Monte Cristo (1975) - Ali
Four of the Apocalypse (1975) - Bud (final film role)

References

External links

1931 births
2005 deaths
20th-century British male actors
Black British male actors
British blind people
British male film actors
British male stage actors
British male television actors
Deaths from cancer in England
20th-century Guyanese male actors
British Guiana people
Guyanese emigrants to England
People from Georgetown, Guyana